The Málaga Metro is a semi-metro network in Málaga, Spain. It was proposed during the 1990s to ease the crippling congestion when the Ministry of Public Works and Transport commissioned a study in 2001 into the feasibility of constructing a metro system in the city. The system was originally scheduled to open on 31 October 2013.

Two lines finally opened in service on 30 July 2014.

Lines 
Here are the most important features of the two lines:

Route 

Both lines run underground in the city centre. Line 1 goes from there to the University of Málaga. Between Clínico station and the Andalucía Tech terminus, it runs on the surface, which includes some at-grade intersections.

Line 2 runs entirely underground, from the city centre to the Jose Maria Martin Carpena Arena.

Future
An extension of Line 1 from El Perchel further into the city centre with two underground stops, Guadalmedina and Atarazanas, is under construction and due to open at the earliest in 2022. By extending the metro closer to the city centre, patronage is expected to reach 18 million annually.

Line 2 will share El Perchel and Guadalmedina stations with Line 1, then was originally to emerge above ground and continue with four surface-level stops to Hospital Civil. The completion date for this extension is currently unknown, and this extension is predicted to increase overall annual patronage of the metro to 20.5 million. In 2019, the scope of the project was amended to a fully underground alignment from Guadalmedina to Hospital Civil.

Rolling stock 
All trams are Urbos 3, manufactured by the Spanish company Construcciones y Auxiliar de Ferrocarriles. They are fully covered by CCTV and are throughout air-conditioned in an effort to provide security and comfort to a full capacity tramcar of 56 seated passengers with 170 standing. The capacity figure is accurate for likely peak-time usage, but the trains are also fully accessible to disabled passengers, who may slightly decrease capacity.

The trams are already in successful widespread use in other cities, including 30 on trams in Belgrade, with 40 are also planned for the Cuiabá system, in Brazil.

Network Map

References

Sources

External links 

 
 Málaga at UrbanRail.net

2014 establishments in Andalusia
Rail transport in Andalusia
Rapid transit in Spain
Underground rapid transit in Spain
Light rail in Spain
Railway lines opened in 2014